Joseph Butler McKenzie (23 April 1889 – 15 August 1968) was an Australian rules footballer who played with Richmond in the Victorian Football League (VFL).

Notes

External links 

1889 births
1968 deaths
Australian rules footballers from Victoria (Australia)
Richmond Football Club players